Labiobaetis is a genus of mayflies in the family Baetidae.

Species 

Labiobaetis academicus Kaltenbach, Surbakti & Kluge, 2021
Labiobaetis acei Kaltenbach, Garces & Gattolliat, 2020
Labiobaetis alahmadii Gattolliat & Al Dhafer, 2018
Labiobaetis aldabae Kaltenbach, Garces & Gattolliat, 2020
Labiobaetis altus Kaltenbach & Gattolliat, 2018
Labiobaetis ancoralis Shi & Tong, 2014
Labiobaetis apache McCafferty & Waltz, 1995
Labiobaetis aquacidus Lugo-Ortiz & McCafferty, 1997
Labiobaetis arfak Kaltenbach & Gattolliat, 2021
Labiobaetis atrebatinus (Eaton 1870)
Labiobaetis baganii Kaltenbach, Garces & Gattolliat, 2020
Labiobaetis bakerae Kaltenbach & Gattolliat, 2020
Labiobaetis balcanicus (Müller-Liebenau & Soldán, 1981)
Labiobaetis balkei Kaltenbach & Gattolliat, 2018
Labiobaetis batakorum Kaltenbach & Gattolliat, 2019
Labiobaetis bellus (Barnard, 1932)
Labiobaetis boettgeri (Ulmer, 1924)
Labiobaetis borneoensis (Müller-Liebenau, 1984)
Labiobaetis boussoulius (Gillies, 1993)
Labiobaetis branchiaesetis Kaltenbach & Gattolliat, 2018
Labiobaetis camiguinensis Kaltenbach, Garces & Gattolliat, 2020
Labiobaetis catadupa Kaltenbach & Gattolliat, 2021
Labiobaetis centralensis Kaltenbach & Gattolliat, 2018
Labiobaetis claudiae Kaltenbach & Gattolliat, 2018
Labiobaetis cleopatrae (Thomas & Soldán, 1989)
Labiobaetis dalisay Kaltenbach, Garces & Gattolliat, 2020
Labiobaetis dambrensis Gattolliat, 2001
Labiobaetis dayakorum Kaltenbach & Gattolliat, 2020
Labiobaetis delocadoi Kaltenbach, Garces & Gattolliat, 2020
Labiobaetis dendrisetis Kaltenbach & Gattolliat, 2018
Labiobaetis difficilis (Müller-Liebenau, 1984)
Labiobaetis diffundus (Müller-Liebenau, 1984)
Labiobaetis ediai Kaltenbach & Gattolliat, 2021
Labiobaetis elisae Kaltenbach & Gattolliat, 2018
Labiobaetis elouardi (Gillies, 1993)
Labiobaetis excavatus Kaltenbach & Gattolliat, 2021
Labiobaetis fabulosus Lugo-Ortiz & McCafferty, 1997
Labiobaetis freitagi Kaltenbach, Garces & Gattolliat, 2020
Labiobaetis gamay Kaltenbach, Garces & Gattolliat, 2020
Labiobaetis gambiae (Gillies, 1993)
Labiobaetis gilliesi Gattolliat, 2001
Labiobaetis gindroi Kaltenbach & Gattolliat, 2018
Labiobaetis giselae Kaltenbach, Garces & Gattolliat, 2020
Labiobaetis gladius Kaltenbach & Gattolliat, 2018
Labiobaetis glaucus (Agnew, 1961)
Labiobaetis gueuningi Kaltenbach & Gattolliat, 2019
Labiobaetis hattam Kaltenbach & Gattolliat, 2021
Labiobaetis insolitus (Kopelke, 1981)
Labiobaetis itineris Kaltenbach & Gattolliat, 2019
Labiobaetis jacobusi Kubendran & Balasubramanian, 2015
Labiobaetis janae Kaltenbach & Gattolliat, 2018
Labiobaetis jonasi Kaltenbach & Gattolliat, 2019
Labiobaetis kalengoensis (Kopelke, 1980)
Labiobaetis lachicae Kaltenbach, Garces & Gattolliat, 2020
Labiobaetis latus (Agnew, 1961)
Labiobaetis lobatus Kaltenbach & Gattolliat, 2018
Labiobaetis longicercus Gattolliat, 2001
Labiobaetis lubu Kaltenbach & Gattolliat, 2019
Labiobaetis masai Lugo-Ortiz & McCafferty, 1997
Labiobaetis mendozai Kaltenbach, Garces & Gattolliat, 2020
Labiobaetis michaeli Kaltenbach & Gattolliat, 2018
Labiobaetis minang Kaltenbach & Gattolliat, 2019
Labiobaetis molawinensis (Müller-Liebenau, 1982)
Labiobaetis moriharai Müller-Liebenau, 1984
Labiobaetis morus (Chang & Yang, 1994)
Labiobaetis mtonis (Gillies, 1994)
Labiobaetis multus (Müller-Liebenau, 1984) 
Labiobaetis mustus (Kang & Yang, 1996) 
Labiobaetis nadineae Lugo-Ortiz & McCafferty, 1997 
Labiobaetis nigrocercus Gattolliat, 2001 
Labiobaetis numeratus (Müller-Liebenau, 1984)
Labiobaetis onim Kaltenbach & Gattolliat, 2021
Labiobaetis operosus (Müller-Liebenau, 1984)
Labiobaetis orientis Kaltenbach & Gattolliat, 2018
Labiobaetis pakpak Kaltenbach & Gattolliat, 2019
Labiobaetis palawano Kaltenbach, Garces & Gattolliat, 2020
Labiobaetis pangantihoni Kaltenbach, Garces & Gattolliat, 2020
Labiobaetis papuaensis Kaltenbach & Gattolliat, 2018
Labiobaetis paradiffundus Kaltenbach & Gattolliat, 2019
Labiobaetis paranumeratus Kaltenbach & Gattolliat, 2019
Labiobaetis paravitilis Kaltenbach & Gattolliat, 2018
Labiobaetis paravultuosus Kaltenbach & Gattolliat, 2018
Labiobaetis pelingeni Kaltenbach, Garces & Gattolliat, 2020
Labiobaetis penan Kaltenbach & Gattolliat, 2020
Labiobaetis pilosus Kaltenbach & Gattolliat, 2019
Labiobaetis piscis Lugo-Ortiz & McCafferty, 1997
Labiobaetis planus Kaltenbach & Gattolliat, 2018
Labiobaetis plumbago Lugo-Ortiz & McCafferty, 1997
Labiobaetis podolakae Kaltenbach & Gattolliat, 2018
Labiobaetis potamoticus Gattolliat & Al Dhafer, 2018
Labiobaetis punctatus Gattolliat, 2001
Labiobaetis rimba Kaltenbach & Gattolliat, 2019
Labiobaetis roulade Kaltenbach & Gattolliat, 2019
Labiobaetis sabordoi Kaltenbach, Garces & Gattolliat, 2020
Labiobaetis schwanderae Kaltenbach & Gattolliat, 2018
Labiobaetis seramensis Kaltenbach & Gattolliat, 2019
Labiobaetis soldani Kubendran, Rathinakumar, Balasubramanian, Selvakumar & Sivaramakrishnan, 2014
Labiobaetis sonajuventus Webb, 2013
Labiobaetis stagnum Kaltenbach & Gattolliat, 2018
Labiobaetis sulawesiensis Kaltenbach & Gattolliat, 2019
Labiobaetis sumbensis Kaltenbach & Gattolliat, 2019
Labiobaetis sumigarensis (Müller-Liebenau, 1982)
Labiobaetis tagbanwa Kaltenbach, Garces & Gattolliat, 2020
Labiobaetis tenuicrinitus Kluge & Novikova, 2016
Labiobaetis toraja Kaltenbach & Gattolliat, 2021
Labiobaetis tricolor (Tshernova 1928)
Labiobaetis valdezorum Kaltenbach, Garces & Gattolliat, 2020
Labiobaetis vallus Kaltenbach & Gattolliat, 2018
Labiobaetis vinosus (Barnard, 1932)
Labiobaetis vulgaris Gattolliat, 2001
Labiobaetis wahai Kaltenbach & Gattolliat, 2019
Labiobaetis wantzeni Kaltenbach, Garces & Gattolliat, 2020
Labiobaetis weifangae Kaltenbach & Gattolliat, 2019
Labiobaetis werneri Kaltenbach & Gattolliat, 2021
Labiobaetis xeniolus (Lugo-Ortiz & McCafferty, 1999)

References

Mayflies
Mayfly genera
Insects of Europe